Alan Calvert (1875 – June 24, 1944) was an American weightlifter, businessman, magazine publisher, and the author of several books. He was the founder of one of the first barbell companies in the world and one of the first strength-training magazines in the United States.

Life
Calvert was born in 1875. He became a weightlifter after reading A Natural Methodist of Physical Training by Edwin Checkley.

Calvert founded one of the earliest barbell companies in the world, the Milo Bar-bell Company, in Philadelphia in 1902. He was the founding publisher of Strength, one of the first strength-training magazines in the United States, from 1914 to 1920. In 1919, he sold both the Milo Bar-bell Company and Strength magazine to Richard L. Hunter and Daniel G. Redmond in 1919. In 1932, the company was purchased by Bob Hoffman, who renamed it the York Barbell.

Calvert wrote several books about weightlifting. In his writings, he promoted progressive strength training, and he argued: "There is no greater asset in the business world, and in the social world, than a fine physique."

Calvert died on June 24, 1944, in St. Davids, Pennsylvania.  He is interred at West Laurel Hill Cemetery, Bala Cynwyd, Pennsylvania.

Selected works

References

1875 births
1944 deaths
American male weightlifters
American publishers (people)
Burials at West Laurel Hill Cemetery
People associated with physical culture
People from Delaware County, Pennsylvania
Strength training writers